The Jammu and Kashmir Apni Party (JKAP) is a political party in Jammu and Kashmir, India, founded by Altaf Bukhari in March 2020.

History
The Jammu and Kashmir Apni Party was formed on 8 March 2020 by thirty one former members of the Jammu and Kashmir Peoples Democratic Party,  and Indian National Congress which included former members of the Jammu and Kashmir Legislative Assembly and cabinet ministers in the Government of Jammu and Kashmir. Altaf Bukhari was elected as the party's first president

An early success for the new party was its successful campaign to get the central Government of India to amend a recently promulgated law in order to make sure that government jobs in the region continue to be reserved for people with domiciled status.

In November 2020, Junaid Azim Mattu was elected as Mayor of Srinagar and he joined Jammu and Kashmir Apni Party in presence of Altaf Bukhari thus making him first Mayor of the Party.

Policy platform
The party describes itself as being "of the commoners, by the commoners and for the commoners". One of the party's key demands is the full restoration of statehood for Jammu and Kashmir. The party also believes that government jobs in Jammu and Kashmir should be reserved for long standing residents of the region. It wants members of the displaced Kashmiri Hindu community to be able to safely return to their homes in the Kashmir Valley. The party is against the dynastic politics espoused by the Peoples democratic Party, which is dominated by the Sayeed family, the National Conference, which is dominated by the Abdullah family and the Indian National Congress, which is dominated by the Nehru–Gandhi family.

The Youth Wing of Jammu and Kashmir Apni Party has been named as Youth Apni Party while as its student wing is named as Jammu and Kashmir Apni Student Union.The Women's Wing of Jammu and Kashmir Apni Party has been named as Apni Party Women's Wing, headed by Former Special Secretary Home, Dilshad Shaheen as Provincial President

See also 
 Politics of Jammu and Kashmir 
 Jammu & Kashmir National Conference
 Jammu and Kashmir Peoples Democratic Party
 Jammu and Kashmir Workers Party
 Ikkjutt Jammu
 Bharatiya Janata Party
 Indian National Congress

References

External links
Jammu and Kashmir Apni Party on Facebook
Jammu and Kashmir Apni Party on Twitter
Founding statement
Full list of founding members

Political parties in India
State political parties in Jammu and Kashmir
Jammu and Kashmir Apni Party
2020 establishments in Jammu and Kashmir
Political parties established in 2020